Dameon Reilly (born May 10, 1963) is a former wide receiver in the National Football League.

Early life and high school
Reilly was born and grew up in The Bronx, New York and attended Aviation Career & Technical Education High School in Long Island City, Queens. Reilly did not play high school football and only played the game in sandlots until college.

College career
Reilly began his collegiate career at Nassau Community College, where he walked-on to the football team, before transferring to Rhode Island after his freshman year. He was named first-team All-Yankee Conference in each of his three seasons with the Rams and set a conference record with 38 touchdown receptions along with 165 catches and 2,698 receiving yards.

Professional career
Reilly was signed by the Indianapolis Colts as an undrafted free agent in 1986. He spent the 1986 season on injured reserve and was cut during training camp the following season. Reilly was signed by the Miami Dolphins in October 1987 as a replacement player during the 1987 NFL players strike, catching five passes for 70 yards in three games before being released after the strike ended. Reilly played for the Saskatchewan Roughriders of the Canadian Football League in 1988.

References

1963 births
Living people
American football wide receivers
Rhode Island Rams football players
National Football League replacement players
Players of American football from New York (state)
Indianapolis Colts players
Miami Dolphins players
Saskatchewan Roughriders players
Nassau Lions football players
American players of Canadian football